Russell Brown (May 30, 1892 in Philadelphia, Pennsylvania – October 19, 1964 in Englewood, New Jersey) was an American Tony Award-winning actor of stage and film. Brown, a stage actor for decades, is best remembered by audiences as Captain Brackett in South Pacific, which he repeated in the movie version, and for his performances as "Benny Van Buren" in the stage/film version of Damn Yankees in 1958, and the following year as park caretaker George Lemon in the classic courtroom drama, Anatomy of a Murder (1959). For his stage performance in "Damn Yankees!", he earned Broadway's Tony Award in 1956, as did actor Ray Walston, actress Gwen Verdon and her choreographer husband Bob Fosse, among others, all for the same Tony Award-winning musical.

Filmography

External links
 
 
 

1892 births
1964 deaths
20th-century American male actors
American male film actors
American male stage actors
American male television actors
Tony Award winners
Burials at Kensico Cemetery